"Time on My Hands" is a popular song with music by Vincent Youmans and lyrics by Harold Adamson and Mack Gordon, published in 1930. Introduced in the musical Smiles by Marilyn Miller and Paul Gregory, it is sometimes also co-credited to Reginald Connelly.

The song was used in the Marilyn Miller biopic Look for the Silver Lining (1949) when it was performed by Gordon MacRae and June Haver at the Broadway rehearsal and during the opening night show.

It was also employed in the 1953 film So This Is Love when it was sung by Kathryn Grayson.

Notable Recordings
Lee Wiley recorded October 26, 1931
Django Reinhardt recorded May 23, 1939
Chet Baker — Chet (1959)
Connee Boswell recorded November 2, 1931
Al Bowlly recorded February 19, 1931
Russ Columbo recorded October 9, 1931
Billie Holiday recorded June 7, 1940
Billy Eckstine recorded 1946 with B.E. Orchestra
Marlene Dietrich recorded in German, as Sag' Mir 'Adieu''', November 1951
Paul Bley - recorded in NYC, August 26 and 30, 1954, for his album Paul Bley (1954)
Oscar Pettiford - recorded in NYC, December 17, 1954, for his album Basically Duke (1954)
Barney Wilen - recorded in Paris, France, April 24 & 25, 1959, for the album More from Barney at the Club Sanit-Germain (1959)
Ben Webster recorded October 15, 1957 for the album Soulville
Harry James - In A Relaxed Mood (MGM E-4274, 1965)
Bing Crosby - for his album Feels Good, Feels Right (1976).
Trio con Tromba — (Allan Hallberg Riedel) recorded 1984
Bryan Ferry recorded October 25, 1999
Les Deux Love Orchestra recorded 2001
Keith Jarrett recorded September 26, 2005
Ted Heath
Glenn Miller

ReferencesWho Wrote That Song? by Dick Jacobs and Harriet Jacobs. Published Writers Digest Books''

Songs with music by Vincent Youmans
Songs with lyrics by Mack Gordon
Songs with lyrics by Harold Adamson
1930 songs
Al Bowlly songs